The Eyoub Mosque is a mosque in Hamdallaye Aci, Bamako, Mali.

History
The mosque was constructed with a cost of XOF2 billion which was fully funded by the Government of Turkey. The construction started in 2012 and completed a year later in 2013.

Architecture
The mosque was constructed in Ottoman architectural style. Its interior design features a central fault decorated with Islamic calligraphy. Its wall is made of marbles and filled with tinted glass brought from Turkey.

See also
 Islam in Mali

References

2013 establishments in Mali
Buildings and structures in Bamako
Mosques completed in 2013
Mosques in Mali
Ottoman architecture